Peter J. Schmidt (April 24, 1948 – September 29, 2000) was an American football coach.  He was the head football coach at Albion College from 1983 to 1996 and led the school to nine Michigan Intercollegiate Athletic Association (MIAA) championships and the NCAA Division III Football Championship in 1994.  He has also served as the offensive coordinator at Indiana University from 1997 to 1999.  Schmidt died in September 2000 at age 52 after a year-long battle with cancer.  Schmidt's overall record in 14 years as a college football head coach is 104–27–4.  Since 2001, the Pete Schmidt Memorial Scholar-Athlete Award has been presented each year by the MIAA football coaches to an outstanding scholar-athlete at an MIAA school.

Head coaching record

College

References

1948 births
2000 deaths
Albion Britons football coaches
Alma Scots football players
Indiana Hoosiers football coaches
High school football coaches in Michigan
Sportspeople from Bloomington, Indiana
Deaths from cancer in Indiana
Deaths from lymphoma